Kuttippuram is a town and a block headquarters, which is situated in the Tirur Taluk, Malappuram district of Kerala state, India. The town is located 34 kilometres south-west of Malappuram. The Bharathappuzha river flows through Kuttippuram. According to the last Census of India conducted in 2011, Kuttippuram forms a portion of the Malappuram metropolitan area.

History

Kuttippuram, on the northern bank of the river Bharathappuzha, was ruled by the Zamorin of Calicut during the middle ages. Kuttippuram railway station is one of the oldest railway stations in Kerala. The second railway line in Kerala was laid from Tirur to Kuttippuram in 1861, as an extension of the first line laid from Tirur to Beypore in the same year. In the 1940s, several national leaders including C. Rajagopalachari, M. Bhaktavatsalam, and Yakkob Hassan has visited Kuttippuram. Fakhruddin Ali Ahmed, a former president of India, has also visited here. The ashes of Mahatma Gandhi, Jawaharlal Nehru, and Lal Bahadur Shastri, were deposited in Kerala between Tirunavaya, Kuttippuram, and Thavanur, on the bank of the river Bharathappuzha. 

The Kuttippuram bridge, built-in 1953, is one of the famous bridges in Kerala. The poem Kuttippuram Palam, describing the beauty of Bharathappuzha River at the sandy riverbank of Kuttippuram, was written by the poet Edasseri Govindan Nair. Kuttippuram was also a constituency to the Kerala Legislative Assembly from 1957 to 2011, which was then replaced by Kottakkal constituency.

Tirunavaya, the centre of medieval Mamankam festival, and Athavanad, which was the centre of Azhvanchery Thamprakkal, lie adjacent to Kuttippuram.

Geography

Industries
Kuttippuram is home to some of the major public sector industries in the state. The municipal town of Valanchery is situated adjacent to Kuttippuram Grama Panchayat. There is a demand to upgrade Kuttippuram Grama Panchayat into a municipality. 
 The Kerala State Detergents and Chemicals Ltd. has its headquarters at Kuttippuram.
 The KELTRON (Kerala State Electronics Development Corporation) Electro Ceramics (KELCERA) is located here.
 A KELTRON tool room is also located here.

Educational institutions

College(s)
 MES College of Engineering, opened in 1994, is the first and oldest self-financing engineering college in Kerala.
 KMCT College Kuttippuram

School(s)
 Government Higher Secondary School, Kuttippuram
 Junior Technical High School, Kuttippuram

Connectivity

 Railway Station: Kuttippuram is  home to two railway stations, Kuttippuram railway station opened in 1861, which is also one of the oldest stations in the state, and a minor railway station - Perassannur railway station.

 Road: Kuttippuram is well connected to the other cities by road,  National Highway-66 passes through the town. NH-66 connects Kuttippuram with the cities of Kozhikode and Kochi. The SH 69 (Thrissur-Kuttippuram State Highway) connects Kuttippuram with Thrissur city. The Kuttippuram bridge is one of the famous bridges in Kerala, which was built in 1953, to connect Kozhikode with Kochi through National Highway-66. There are regular buses plying to other cities including Malappuram, Kozhikode, Kochi, Thrissur, and Coimbatore. There are a few private buses offering over night journeys to Bangalore, Trivandrum, and Coimbatore.

Kuttippuram Block

Kuttippuram Block Panchayat is the block-level administrative body responsible for the administration of the following Gram panchayats:
 Kuttippuram 
 Edayur
 Irimbiliyam
 Marakkara
 Athavanad
 Kalpakanchery

Valanchery municipality shares its boundary with Kuttippuram town, which was a Gram panchayat in Kuttippuram block until 2015.

Notable people
 Edasseri Govindan Nair - Poet
 Iqbal Kuttippuram - Screenwriter
 Kuttippuram Kesavan Nair - Poet
 M. T. Vasudevan Nair - Malayalam writer (Born at Kudallur, just opposite to Kuttippuram, through Bharathappuzha River)

See also
 Kuttippuram (State Assembly constituency)
 Kuttippuram bridge
 Kuttippuram railway station
 Kuttippuram Block Panchayat
 Valanchery
 Tirunavaya
 Athavanad
 Thavanur
 Kudallur
 Marakkara
 Triprangode
 Edayoor
 Irimbiliyam
 Kumbidi
 Anakkara

References

External links

 Kuttippuram website
 Kudallur Village

Cities and towns in Malappuram district
Populated waterside places in India